The Associação Brasileira de Editores Científicos (ABEC Brasil), is a Brazilian nonprofit organization founded in 1985, and dedicated to the advancement of publication of scientific journals. ABEC Brasil is headquartered in Botucatu, São Paulo (state), Brazil and its president is Sigmar de Mello Rode.

History 
ABEC Brasil was founded on October 11th 1985, during the Second Meeting of Scientific Journal Editors, at ICB/USP. Its first President was Francisco Alberto de Moura Duarte.

Activities
ABEC Brasil is interested in developing and improving the publication of scientific journals, and stimulates this through regularly publishing material of scientific editorial interest, promoting of conferences, seminars and courses, and maintaining contact with institutions and related societies in Brazil and abroad.

See also
 SciELO
 Latin American and Caribbean Health Sciences Literature
 National Council for Scientific and Technological Development

References

External links 
 

Communications and media organizations
Science writing organizations
Science communication
Professional associations based in Brazil
Communications and media organisations based in Brazil
Organizations established in 1985
1985 establishments in Brazil